Walter Claus-Oehler (7 May 1897 – 8 November 1941) was a German footballer who played as a midfielder for Arminia Bielefeld and the Germany national team.

Personal life
Claus-Oehler served as a Hauptmann (captain) in the German Army during the Second World War and died on active service on 8 November 1941. He is buried in Mont-de-Huisnes German war cemetery.

References

External links
 
 

1897 births
1941 deaths
Association football midfielders
German footballers
Germany international footballers
Arminia Bielefeld players
German Army officers of World War II
German Army personnel killed in World War II
Sportspeople from Gera
Footballers from Thuringia
Military personnel from Thuringia